The Wiesbaden State Library, formerly the Nassau State Library and Hessian State Library, is one of the state libraries of Germany. It is funded by the State of Hesse and located in Wiesbaden. With collections currently comprising over one million books, it is one of Germany's largest research libraries. The major special collection is on the historical state of Nassau, in which the library has its roots. As of 1 January 2011 it became part of the RheinMain University of Applied Sciences. The library building is situated in the ) in central Wiesbaden.

See also 
 List of libraries in Germany
 State libraries of Germany
 Staatsbibliothek

External links 

 

Libraries in Germany
Buildings and structures in Wiesbaden
Culture in Wiesbaden
Education in Wiesbaden
1813 establishments in Germany
Tourist attractions in Wiesbaden
Deposit libraries